Our Lady of Mercy College (or O.L.M.C) is the name of several Roman Catholic schools around the world.

Australia:
Our Lady of Mercy College, Australind, WA.
Our Lady of Mercy College, Burraneer, NSW.
Our Lady of Mercy College, Heidelberg, Vic.
Our Lady of Mercy College, Parramatta, NSW.
Our Lady of Mercy College, Mackay, Qld.

Ireland:
Our Lady of Mercy College, Carysfort, Dublin

Philippines:
Bacolod Our Lady of Mercy College, Bacolod City

Australian schools formed by merging with an 'Our Lady of Mercy College':
Red Bend Catholic College, Forbes, NSW (Our Lady of Mercy College, Forbes, and Our Lady of Mercy High School, Parkes) 
Trinity Catholic College, Goulburn, NSW

See also
Our Lady of Mercy Academy (disambiguation)
Our Lady of Mercy High School (disambiguation)
Academy of Our Lady of Mercy, Lauralton Hall, Milford, Connecticut